Fonsomme (before 2011: Fonsommes) is a commune in the Aisne department in Hauts-de-France in northern France.

Geography
The source of the river Somme lies in the commune.

Population

See also
Communes of the Aisne department

References

Communes of Aisne
Aisne communes articles needing translation from French Wikipedia